Percivale Campbell (26 December 1887 – 18 March 1960) was an English cricketer.  Campbell's batting and bowling styles are unknown, though it is known he occasionally fielded as a wicket-keeper.  He was born at West Ham, Essex.

Campbell made his first-class debut for Essex against Nottinghamshire at Trent Bridge in the 1911 County Championship.  He made twelve further first-class appearances for the county, the last of which came after World War I against Gloucestershire in the 1919 County Championship.  In his thirteen first-class appearances, Campbell scored 270 runs at an average of 14.21, with a high score of 35.

He died at South Woodford, Essex, on 18 March 1960.

References

External links
Percy Campbell at ESPNcricinfo
Percy Campbell at CricketArchive

1887 births
1960 deaths
People from West Ham
English cricketers
Essex cricketers